Crenicichla cincta is a species of cichlid native to South America. It is found in the Amazon River basin in Brazil, Peru, and Ecuador, from the Napo River to Marajó Island.

References

Kullander, S.O., 1986. Cichlid fishes of the Amazon River drainage of Peru. Department of Vertebrate Zoology, Research Division, Swedish Museum of Natural History, Stockholm, Sweden, 394 p.

cincta
Fish of Ecuador
Freshwater fish of Brazil
Freshwater fish of Peru
Fish of the Amazon basin
Taxa named by Charles Tate Regan
Fish described in 1905